Rogerick Green (born December 15, 1969) is a former American football defensive back. He played for the Tampa Bay Buccaneers in 1992 and 1994 and for the Jacksonville Jaguars in 1995.

References

1969 births
Living people
Players of American football from San Antonio
American football defensive backs
Kansas State Wildcats football players
Tampa Bay Buccaneers players
Jacksonville Jaguars players